The requinto jarocho or guitarra de son is plucked string instrument, played usually with a special pick. It is a four- or five-stringed instrument that has originated from Veracruz, Mexico. The requinto is used in conjunto jarocho ensembles. In the absence of the arpa, the requinto typically introduces the melodic theme of the son and then continues by providing a largely improvised counterpoint to the vocal line.

Characteristics 
The requinto jarocho is shaped like a guitar with a small body. The body, neck and tuning head is made from one piece of wood. It has a shallow body, and a slightly raised fingerboard. It also has 12 frets.

The four-stringed requinto jarocho can follow the standard tuning of (ADGc), but is also commonly tuned to GADg and CDGc. The five-stringed requinto, however, adds a string above the standard tuning 5 half-steps below the initial first string, making it EADGc.

The requinto jarocho strings are made of nylon; when played it sounds like the bottom four strings of a classical guitar.

Gallery

References 

Mexican musical instruments
Guitar family instruments
Jarocho